Partap Pore or Pratap Pur is a village in the Leh district of Ladakh, India. It is located in the Nubra tehsil near Hundar.

Geography 
Pratap Pur is in the Shyok river valley, adjacent to Hundar, near the confluence of the Nubra River with Shyok.

Demographics
According to the 2011 census of India, Partap Pore has 197 households. The effective literacy rate (i.e. the literacy rate of population excluding children aged 6 and below) is 94.81%.

References

Villages in Nubra tehsil